The Communications Data Bill refers to two bills of the Parliament of the United Kingdom.
 The Communications Data Bill 2008, proposed by the Labour government in 2008 but never published as a draft bill;
 Its successor, the Draft Communications Data Bill, a draft bill produced for consultation by the Conservative-Liberal Democrat coalition government in 2012 but never introduced into Parliament.

See also
 Investigatory Powers Bill, the successor to the above introduced into Parliament by the Conservative government in 2016.